The 2006 Nevada Wolf Pack football team represented the University of Nevada, Reno during the 2006 NCAA Division I FBS football season. Nevada competed as a member of the Western Athletic Conference (WAC). The Wolf Pack were led by Chris Ault in his 22nd overall and 3rd straight season since taking over as head coach for the third time in 2004. They played their home games at Mackay Stadium.

Schedule

Game summaries

at Fresno State

at Arizona State

Colorado State

Northwestern

at UNLV

at Hawaii

San Jose State

New Mexico State

at Idaho

Utah State

at Louisiana Tech

Boise State

vs. Miami (FL)

References

Nevada
Nevada Wolf Pack football seasons
Nevada Wolf Pack football